Tachosa sagittalis is a moth of the family Erebidae. It is found in Ethiopia, Kenya, Sudan, Tanzania and Uganda.

References

Moths described in 1912
Tachosa
Moths of Africa